Pultenaea gunnii, commonly known as golden bush-pea, is a species of flowering plant in the family Fabaceae and is endemic to south-eastern Australia. It is a slender, erect to spreading shrub with hairy young stems, egg-shaped to lance-shaped leaves with lance-shaped stipules at the base, and bright yellow and dark red flowers.

Description
The flowers are bright yellow to dark red and arranged in groups of more than three near the ends of short side branches. Flowering occurs from September to November and the fruit is a flattened pod.

Taxonomy and naming
Pultenaea gunnii was first formally described in 1837 by George Bentham in the Commentationes de Leguminosarum Generibus from specimens collected by Ronald Campbell Gunn near Campbell Town in 1836.

In 1993 Margaret Corrick described two subspecies in the journal Muelleria and the names are accepted by the Australian Plant Census:
 Pultenaea gunnii Benth. subsp. gunnii has the edges of the leaves curved downwards;
 Pultenaea gunnii subsp. tuberculata Corrick has the edges of the leaves thickened, but not curved downwards.

Distribution and habitat
Golden bush-pea is common and widespread in eastern Victoria and in Tasmania, where it grows in forest and woodland. It is also found on the south coast of New South Wales. Subspecies tuberculata is only known from the Brisbane Ranges in southern Victoria.

References

gunnii
Fabales of Australia
Flora of New South Wales
Flora of Tasmania
Flora of Victoria (Australia)